Mustilizans dierli is a moth in the family Endromidae. It was described by Jeremy Daniel Holloway in 1987. It is found on Borneo and in Yunnan, China. It is found at elevations ranging from lowlands to 2,000 meters.

The forewing length is 25–28 mm.

Subspecies
Mustilizans dierli dierli (Borneo)
Mustilizans dierli refugialis Zolotuhin, 2007 (China: Yunnan)

References

Moths described in 1987
Mustilizans